Karol Beck and Lukáš Rosol were the defending champions, but decided not to participate.
Colin Ebelthite and Jaroslav Pospíšil won the title, defeating Alexander Bury and Andrei Vasilevski 6–3, 6–4 in the final.

Seeds

Draw

Draw

References
 Main Draw

ATP Challenger Trophy - Doubles
2011 Doubles